Moncina is a subtribe of butterflies in the skipper subfamily Hesperiinae.

Genera
The following genera are recognised in the subtribe Moncina:
 
Adlerodea Hayward, 1940 - 4 species
Alerema Hayward, 1942 - 1 species
Alychna Grishin, 2019 - 7 species
Amblyscirtes Scudder, 1872 - 29 species
Arita Evans, 1955 - 4 species
Artines Godman, 1901 - 10 species
Artonia Grishin, 2019 - 1 species
Brownus - 1 species
Bruna Evans, 1955
Callimormus Scudder, 1872 - 9 species
Cantha Evans, 1955 - 6 species
Chitta  Grishin, 2019 - 1 species
Cobalopsis Godman, 1900 - 16 species
Contrastia Grishin, 2022 - 1 species
Corra Grishin, 2019 - 1 species
Crinifemur Steinhauser, 2008 - 1 species
Cumbre Evans, 1955 - 3 species
Cymaenes Scudder, 1872 - 27 species
Dion Godman, 1901 - 3 species
 Dubia - 1 species
Duroca Grishin, 2019
Eprius (Godman, 1901) - 3 species
Eutocus Godman, 1901 - 8 species
Eutus Grishin, 2022
Eutychide Godman, 1900 - 8 species
Fidius Grishin, 2019 - 2 species
Gallio (Schaus, 1902) - 7 species
Ginungagapus Carneiro, Mielke & Casagrande, 2015  - 4 species
Godmia Grishin, 2022 - 1 species
Gracilata Grishin, 2022 - 1 species
Gubrus Grishin, 2022 - 1 species
Gufa Grishin, 2022 - 2 species
Halotus Godman, 1900 - 3 species
Haza - 1 species
Hermio Grishin, 2022 - 2 species
Igapophilus Mielke, 1980 - 1 species
Inglorius Austin, 1997 - 1 species
Joanna Evans, 1955 - 3 species
Koria Grishin, 2022 - 1 species
Lamponia Evans, 1955 - 3 species
Lattus Grishin, 2022 - 1 species
Lento Evans, 1955 - 19 species
Lerema Scudder, 1872 - 16 species
Lerodea Scudder, 1872 - 8 species
Levina (Plötz, 1884) - 1 species
Lucida Evans, 1955- 5 species
Ludens Evans, 1955 - 12 species
Lurida Grishin, 2019 - 1 species
Mit Grishin, 2022 - 2 species
Mnasicles Godman, 1901 - 13 species
Mnasides Godman, 1901 - 3 species
Mnasitheus Godman, 1900 - 11 species
Mnestheus Godman, 1901 - 2 species
Moeris Godman, 1900 - 5 species
Molla Evans, 1955 - 1 species
Monca Evans, 1955 - 4 species
Mucia Godman, 1900 - 4 species
Naevolus (Mabille, 1883) - 1 species
Nastra Evans, 1955 - 11 species
Niconiades Hübner, 1821 - 18 species
Onophas Godman, 1900 - 3 species
Panca (Hayward, 1934) - 1 species
Papias Evans, 1955 - 11 species
Paracarystus Godman, 1900 - 3 species
Pares Bell, 1959 - 2 species
Parphorus Godman, 1900 - 15 species
Peba (Schaus, 1902) - 1 species
Phanes Godman, 1901 - 7 species
Pheraeus Godman, 1900 - 11 species
Phlebodes Hübner, 1819 - 12 species
Picova Grishin, 2022 - 2 species 
Psoralis Mabille, 1904 - 14 species
Punta Evans, 1955 - 1 species
Radiatus Mielke, 1968 - 1 species
Ralis Grishin, 2019 - 2 species
Rectava Grishin, 2022 - 4 species
Rhinthon Godman, 1900 - 2 species
Rhomba Grishin, 2022 - 1 species
Rigga - 6 species
Saturnus Evans, 1955 - 5 species
Sodalia Evans, 1955 - 3 species
Sucova (Schaus, 1902) - 1 species
 Tava - 1 species
Thargella Godman, 1900 - 4 species
Thoon Godman, 1900 - 12 species
Tigasis Godman, 1901 - 9 species
Tricrista Grishin, 2019 - 5 species
Veadda Grishin, 2019 - 1 species
Vehilius Godman, 1900 - 12 species
Venas Evans, 1955 - 2 species
Vertica Evans, 1955 - 4 species
Vettius Godman, 1901 - 24 species
Vidius Evans, 1955 - 15 species
Vinius Godman, 1900 - 3 species
Vinpeius (Evans, 1955) - 1 species
Virga Evans, 1955- 8 species
Viridina Grishin, 2019 - 3 species
Vistigma Hayward, 1939 - 7 species
Zalomes Bell, 1947
Zariaspes Godman, 1900 - 2 species

References

Hesperiinae